Mark Doyle may refer to:
 Mark Doyle (journalist)
 Mark Doyle (footballer)
 Mark Doyle (rower)